Walter Piston's Concerto No. 1 for Violin and Orchestra was written in 1939 and dedicated to  violinist Ruth Posselt. Posselt, backed by the National Orchestral Association under Léon Barzin, gave the first performance at Carnegie Hall on 18 March 1940.

Amongst the audience was composer Benjamin Britten, who is quoted as telling Aaron Copland, "there was no composer in England of Piston’s age who could turn out anything so expert.”

Structure

The work is in three movements:

1) Allegro energico
2) Andantino molto tranquillo
3) Allegro con spirito

A typical performance will last around 25 minutes.

References

Further reading
Davis, Rachelle Marie. 2004. "Walter Piston's Concerto No. 1 for Violin and Orchestra: Thematic and Motivic Transformation, Style, and Violinistic Issues". DMA dissertation. Austin: University of Texas. .

Compositions by Walter Piston
Piston 01
1939 compositions